Virginie Lagoutte-Clément (born 2 February 1979) is a French professional golfer.

Lagoutte was the French Amateur Champion in 2002 and the European Amateur Champion in 2003. She turned professional in late 2003 and joined the Ladies European Tour in 2004. She competed as Virginie Lagoutte until her marriage in December 2006.

She has won three Ladies European Tour events, the 2005 KLM Ladies Open, the 2006 Finnair Masters, and the 2010 Ladies Scottish Open.

Ladies European Tour wins
2005 KLM Ladies Open
2006 Finnair Masters
2010 Ladies Scottish Open

Team appearances
Professional
World Cup (representing France): 2008

French female golfers
Ladies European Tour golfers
Sportspeople from Drôme
People from Montélimar
1979 births
Living people
20th-century French women